Ganja Auto Plant is an auto assembly plant situated in the Ganja city in Azerbaijan. The factory was founded in 1986 as KiAZ (Kirovabad Automobile Plant) for a production of run of 30,000 "GAZelle" vans according to the project brief. The commissioning was intended to end in 1989 but following a decision of Council of Ministers of the former USSR the construction of the factory was interrupted and the technological project was given to the Bryansk Automobile Plant. The 256 hectares of overall territory, including the 50 hectares of the factory footprint itself, stayed without utilization for 15 years.

Construction of an automobile plant was considered by the government after the end of the Soviet Union when Azerbaijan had obtained its independence. Since 1994 the giant and famous automobile companies of Italy, Korea, Japan, France and Germany showed interest in the facility, but negotiations held with them ended without a deal.

In December 2004 the Ganja automobile plant started manufacturing and the first car built at the factory was sold. In 2008 the plant produced about 600 cars and tractors.

History
Construction of the plant began in 1986 under the name KiAZ (Kirovabad Automobile Factory). The production capacity of the plant was designed to produce 30,000 cars. Construction of the plant for the project was supposed to end in 1989, but because of the collapse of the Soviet Union the construction and operation of the plant was postponed indefinitely. After Azerbaijan gained the independence, in 1993, Turkish company Otokar, showed the interest in factory but due to political change production never implemented. In December 2004 it opened as the Gyandzha Auto Plant and the first car that came out of their production line was presented that year. In the year 2008 the factory produced about 600 vehicles, both cars and tractors, also later bus assembly was started.

This plant serves as one example of the Azeri government's efforts to show progress in diversifying its economy, which has traditionally always been largely dependent on the production oil and gas, and has been able to serve other purposes, in particular, to give a factual basis for political propaganda of the government. It also downplays some of the states main weaknesses, such as having been formerly totally dependent on the import of transport equipment from other nations.

Despite the efforts made at this plant to increase production by Russian interests, the overall production is still very low, being measured in just hundreds of units annuals, where the facility's original concept would accommodate increased production, thousands of units annually.

Recently  Moldovan  and Russian investors have visited the plant in order to see the progress made and the production of their products in this factory, as well as Belarusian investors. 

The opening of the Azerbaijan-Belarus tractor producing plant took place on April 15, 2019 in Turkey, a source in the Ganja Automobile Plant Production Association told AzVision.az.

Products 
 Lada
 VAZ-1111 Oka (2004-2008)

 UAZ
 UAZ-31512 (2006, 2007-present)
 UAZ-31514 (2006, 2007-present)
 UAZ-31519 (2006, 2007-present)
 UAZ 39094 (2006, 2007–present)
 UAZ 396259 (2006, 2007–present)
 UAZ Hunter (2006, 2007–present)
 UAZ Simbir (2006)

 Kamaz trucks
 KamAZ-53501 (2015-present)
 KamAZ-6665 (2015-present)

 MAZ trucks
 MAZ-551605-272 (2007–present)
 MAZ-555102-223 (2007–present)
 MAZ-631705-212 (2007–present)
 MAZ-642205-222 (2007–present)
 MAZ-642208-232 (2007–present)
 MAZ-953000-010 (2007–present, semi-trailer)
 MAZ-based crane truck (2007–present)
 MAZ-based special truck (2007–present)

 MAZ buses
 MAZ-203 (2019-present)
 MAZ-206  (2019-present)

 MTZ Belarus tractorsBelarus 80.1 (2007–present)
 Belarus 80.3 (2007–present)
 Belarus 82.1 (2007–present)
 Belarus 892 (2007–present)
 Belarus 1025 (2007–present)
 Belarus 1221 (2007–present)

 Cma Sampo Combain
 Sampo 2045 (2019–present)

 Chang'an Automobile Group Vans & trucks
 Changan Van Ganca (2005)
 Changan Pick Up Truck''' (2005)

Gallery
Cars and trucks

Buses

Conbain

Tractors

See also
 Azsamand
 Nakhchivan Automobile Plant

References

External links
 Home Page
Ganja Auto homepage

Vehicle manufacturing companies established in 1986
Buildings and structures in Ganja, Azerbaijan
1986 establishments in Azerbaijan
Motor vehicle manufacturers of the Soviet Union
Motor vehicle manufacturers of Azerbaijan
Motor vehicle assembly plants